The Caveman's Valentine is a 2001 American mystery-drama film directed by Kasi Lemmons and starring Samuel L. Jackson based on George Dawes Green's 1994 novel of the same name. The film was released by Universal Focus, a subsidiary of Universal Studios, which would later become Focus Features.

Plot
A former family man and pianist studying at Juilliard music school, Romulus Ledbetter, now suffers from paranoid schizophrenia and lives in a cave in Inwood Park, New York. He believes that a man named Cornelius Gould Stuyvesant is controlling the world with rays from the top of the Chrysler Building, and that his mind is inhabited by moth-like seraphs. On Valentine’s Day, he discovers the frozen body of a young man, Scotty Gates, left in a tree outside his cave. The police, including Romulus's daughter Lulu, dismiss the man's death as an accident. However, a homeless ex-lover of Scotty tells Romulus that he was murdered by the famous photographer David Leppenraub. Determined to discover the truth behind Scotty’s death and prove his worth to his daughter, Romulus manages to get an invitation through a former friend to perform one of his compositions at Leppenraub’s farm. What unfolds thereafter is a twisted tale of mystery, deception, and a man's struggle against his own mind.

Cast

Release

Box office
The Caveman’s Valentine opened in limited release on March 2, 2001, and grossed $112,041 on its opening weekend. After 15 weeks in theaters, the film grossed $687,194.

Critical reception
On review aggregator Rotten Tomatoes, the film has an approval rating of 45% based on 84 reviews, with an average score of 5.17/10. The website's critical consensus reads, "The Caveman's Valentine has an intriguing premise, but the film falls flat under the weight of its ambition." On Metacritic, which uses an average of critics' reviews, the film has 44 out of 100, indicating "mixed or average reviews".

Awards
In 2002, Tamara Tunie was nominated for the Independent Spirit Award for Best Supporting Female.

References

External links
 
 
 
 
 

2000s American films
2000s English-language films
2001 films
2001 crime drama films
2001 crime thriller films
2001 independent films
American crime drama films
American crime thriller films
American mystery films
Films about homelessness
Films about interracial romance
Films about music and musicians
Films about schizophrenia
Films based on American novels
Films directed by Kasi Lemmons
Films produced by Danny DeVito
Films produced by Scott Frank
Films produced by Elie Samaha
Films scored by Terence Blanchard
Films set in New York City
Films shot in New York City
Films shot in Toronto
Franchise Pictures films
Focus Features films
Valentine's Day in films